The Botkoveli is a Georgian family name from the Kakheti region in eastern Georgia.

The Botkoveli family name comes from these towns of Kakheti: Vardisubani, Telavi, Ikalto, Kurdgelauri and Ruispiri. Presently, there are 271 Botkoveli family names in Georgia.

References 

Georgian-language surnames